libxml2 is a software library for parsing XML documents. It is also the basis for the libxslt library which processes XSLT-1.0 stylesheets.

Description 
Written in the C programming language, libxml2 provides bindings to C++, Ch, XSH, C#, Python, Kylix/Delphi and other Pascals, Ruby, Perl, Common Lisp, and PHP.  It was originally developed for the GNOME project, but can be used outside it. libxml2's code is highly portable, since it depends on standard ANSI C libraries only, and it is released under the MIT license. This library was written by Daniel Veillard and receives active feedback from its users.

It includes the command-line utility xmllint and an HTML parser.

See also 

 libxslt (the LibXML2's XSLT module)
 XML validation
 Comparison of HTML parsers
 Expat (library)
 Saxon XSLT 
 Xerces

References

External links 
 
 XML::LibXML Perl module

C (programming language) libraries
Free software programmed in C
GNOME libraries
Software using the MIT license
XML parsers